London Sessions is a live in-studio album by American rock band LCD Soundsystem. It was recorded on June 29, 2010, at "The Pool" recording studio of Miloco Studios in London. A downloadable version of the album was released on November 8, 2010 followed by a physical release on January 24, 2011.  The album was described as being recorded in the spirit of Peel Sessions made for the BBC by the late John Peel.

Track listing

Personnel
LCD Soundsystem
 James Murphy – vocals, percussion 
 Nancy Whang – keyboards, vocals 
 Pat Mahoney – drums, vocals 
 Tyler Pope – bass, percussion, vocals
 Rayna Russom – synth, keyboards, percussion, vocals 
 David Scott Stone - guitar, percussion, vocals, synth
 Matt Thornley – guitar, percussion, vocals

References

2010 albums
LCD Soundsystem albums
DFA Records albums